Pseudastur is a genus of bird of prey in the family Accipitridae. It contains the following species:

Systematics 
The name Pseudastur was coined by Edward Blyth, but was first published in George Robert Gray's Index. The type species is the white hawk, Falco albicollis Latham, 1790.

The species were placed for some time in the genus Leucopternis, however this genus was found to be polyphyletic.  In 2012 the American Ornithologists' Union split Leucopternis, placing the white hawk and its relatives under the old name Pseudaster.

References

External links

 

Higher-level bird taxa restricted to the Neotropics
Taxa named by Edward Blyth